Belogorye may refer to:

Belogorye (geography), a type of mountain also known as "Belki"
Belogorye, Voronezh Oblast, a village in Voronezh Oblast, Russia
Belogorye (selo, Amur Oblast), a village in Amur Oblast, Russian Far East
Belogorye (station, Amur Oblast), a rural locality in Amur Oblast, Russian Far East
Belogorye Nature Reserve, a protected area in Belgorod Oblast, Russia

See also
Belogorie